Sirasa Dancing Stars is a Sri Lankan reality dance show broadcast by Sirasa TV. It went on air on February 9, 2008. It won the award for the most popular program in Sri Lanka earlier that year. It's yet another creation of Mr. Susara Dinal, who also created Sirasa Superstar season 1; Season 2; And Sirasa Kumariya which were some of the most popular programs when they were broadcast on Sirasa TV. Many stars have given their utmost support to make this show a success. Three seasons were completed in the show.

Season 1

Season 2 
The season 2 was started just after the first season due to huge publicity. The show was presented by Nirosha Perera again and the judge panel was with two unchanged personnel, where Sabeetha Perera replaced Malini Fonseka. Former One Day International cricketer Akalanka Ganegama with Shaheema won the season 2.

Winner : Akalanka Ganegama
Runner-up: Kushani Sandareka
3rd place: Chulapadmendra Kumarapathirana

Season 3 
The third season of the show was started six years after the second season. The show also took a new look, where celebrities did not participate in the show. The judges were changed, as was the presenter. Malsha Ravihari won season 3.

Airing 
All three seasons were aired at 9.00pm (SLT) from Sat - Sun on Sirasa TV.

Grand Finale 
Sirasa Dancing Stars - Season 1 July 24, 2008
Sirasa Dancing Stars - Season 2 January 17, 2009
Sirasa Dancing Stars - Season 3 June 14, 2015

References

Sri Lankan television shows
Dance competition television shows
2000s Sri Lankan television series
2008 Sri Lankan television series debuts
2009 Sri Lankan television series endings
Sirasa TV original programming